The 2014–15 season was the 107th season in the history of Northampton Town. They played their games in the fourth tier of English football, League Two, and competed in the FA Cup, League Cup and the Football League Trophy.

Players

Pre-season

Competitions

League Two

League table

Results summary

League position by match

Matches

FA Cup

The draw for the first round of the FA Cup was made on 27 October 2014.

Capital One Cup

Football League Trophy

Appearances, goals and cards

Transfers

In

Out

Loans in

Loans out

References

Northampton Town F.C. seasons
Northampton Town